David Egan (born 19 June 1999) is an Irish jockey who competes in flat racing.He was the champion apprentice in 2017 and is one of the leading young riders in the UK. Roger Varian is his biggest supporter to which they have had a lot of success together.

Background

Egan was born in Kildare, Ireland. He comes from a racing background. His father John is a jockey, his mother Sandra Hughes trained the 2015 Irish Grand National winner Thunder And Roses, his grandfather is Irish trainer Dessie Hughes and his uncle is British champion jockey, Richard Hughes. Egan rode out for his grandfather from the age of 13 and took part in pony racing. He also rode out for flat trainer Willie McCreery.

Career

On leaving school, Egan moved from Ireland to Newmarket, where he was apprenticed to Roger Varian. He was champion apprentice jockey in 2017.

In 2018 Egan turned professional. His first victory in a Group race came on 2 August 2018 when the Roger Varian-trained Pilaster won the Group 2 Lillie Langtry Stakes at Goodwood.

Egan's first race in a Classic came in May 2019 when he rode favourite Qabala into third place in the 1000 Guineas Stakes. Egan's father rode outsider Garrel Glen into twelfth place in the same race. In June 2019 he had his first victory at Royal Ascot, when the Varian-trained Daahyeh won the Albany Stakes.

Having signed a retainer with owner Prince Faisal, Egan rode the John Gosden-trained Mishriff to his maiden victory at Nottingham in November 2019. In February 2021 the pair won the Saudi Cup at Riyadh, Saudi Arabia, before going on to win the Dubai Sheema Classic at Meydan Racecourse, Dubai, in March 2021. After coming third in the Coral Eclipse Stakes and second in the King George VI and Queen Elizabeth Stakes, the partnership secured their first British Group 1 victory in the International Stakes at York on 18 August 2021. On 2 July 2022 Mishriff was narrowly beaten into second place by Vadeni in the Eclipse Stakes at Sandown Park. It was to be Egan's last ride on Mishriff, as later that month his association with Prince Faisal came to an end.

Egan had his second  Royal Ascot winner in 2022, when the Varian-trained Eldar Eldarov won the Queen's Vase. Eldar Eldarov then provided Egan with his first British classic success, winning the St Leger Stakes at Doncaster on 11 September 2022.

Personal life

Egan's girlfriend is Saffie Osborne, jockey and daughter of trainer Jamie Osborne.

Major wins

 United Kingdom
 International Stakes - (1) - Mishriff (2021)
 St Leger Stakes - (1) -  Eldar Eldarov (2022) 

 UAE
 Dubai Sheema Classic - (1) - Mishriff (2021)

References 

1999 births
Living people
Irish jockeys
British Champion apprentice jockeys